Toba Tek Singh is an Indian  film based on Saadat Hassan Manto's short story of the same name. The short film is written and directed by Ketan Mehta and produced by Shailja Kejriwal. It stars Pankaj Kapoor and Vinay Pathak. It was released digitally on the video on-demand platform ZEE5 on 24 August 2018.

Plot

The story takes place just before the India-Pakistan partition in one of the oldest mental asylums in undivided India. Situated in Lahore, it was home to Hindu, Muslim and Sikh patients who were left behind by their uncaring families. Friendships were thick between the patients who had nobody but each other for company. Each had a story that made for an interesting tale but none quite like Bishan Singh. The story of his journey from sanity to madness stemmed from the village he came from, Toba Tek Singh. Now all he does is stay awake every day and night and such has been the case for the last 10 years. But what happens when partition causes him to leave the country he has known to be home in his sane and insane state of mind? It is a story of displacement and how painful it is even for the people who are not in their senses in a worldly way. Irrespective of who you were and what state of mind you were in, partition had nothing but pain for people who experienced it and this is what this film based on the poignant tale by celebrated writer Saadat Hasan Manto, examines.

Cast
  Pankaj Kapur as Toba Tek Singh
  Vinay Pathak as Saddat Hassan
  Chirag Vohra as Roshan Lal; Hindu Vakil
Gaurav Dwivedi as Surajmal
  Nand Kishore Pant as Hamid
  Ajay Kumar as Ittefaq Ali
  Vijai Singh as Zoravar Singh
  Vishwa Bhanu as Mansur Ahmed
  Malkiat Rouni as Tara Singh
  Daljit Singh as Mohammed Ali
  Sheikh Noor Islam
  Gilles Chuyen as Superintendent
  Swami Sarabjeet as Fazaluddin
  Navjot Kaur as Roop Kaur

References

External links

Saadat Hasan Manto
Films set in the partition of India
2018 films
Indian drama films
Films set in Lahore
Films set in psychiatric hospitals
Films based on short fiction
ZEE5 original films
2018 direct-to-video films
2018 drama films
Hindi-language drama films